Riordan McClain (born October 19, 1983) is an American politician who has served in the Ohio House of Representatives from the 87th district since 2018.

In 2019, McClain co-sponsored legislation that would ban abortion in Ohio and criminalize what they called "abortion murder". Doctors who performed abortions in cases of ectopic pregnancy and other life-threatening conditions would be exempt from prosecution only if they "[took] all possible steps to preserve the life of the unborn child, while preserving the life of the woman. Such steps include, if applicable, attempting to reimplant an ectopic pregnancy into the woman's uterus". Reimplantation of an ectopic pregnancy is not a recognized or medically feasible procedure.

References

1983 births
Living people
Republican Party members of the Ohio House of Representatives
21st-century American politicians
People from Upper Sandusky, Ohio
Bluffton University alumni
University of Findlay alumni